Since 2017, the Woodland Trust has led 70 United Kingdom organizations in the call for a Charter for Trees, Woods and People.

History 
The Charter of the Forest was first signed on 6 November 1217 as a sister charter to the Magna Carta from which it had evolved. Some minor changes were made to it, before it was reissued in 1225. It was then joined with Magna Carta in the Confirmation of Charters in 1297. A Charter of the Forest was signed by Henry III to set down rights for people to access the sustainable benefits of the woods, trees and grazing lands of the Royal Forests in England. It provides a window to a period of history when trees and woods were integral to everyday life for firewood, building material and food.

In October 2010, the government introduced the Public Bodies Bill to the House of Lords, which would have enabled the Secretary of State to sell or lease public forests in England. The Woodland Trust believed that the public outcry that stopped those plans revealed the connection people feel to the woods and trees of the UK.

The Independent Panel on Forestry wrote in its 2011 Report:

A Charter should be created for the English Public Forest Estate, to be renewed every ten years. The Charter should specify the public benefit mission and statutory duties.

The call to create a Charter for Trees, Woods and People was first made in January 2016. The Charter for Trees, Woods and People was launched on 6 November 2017 on the 800th anniversary of the Charter of the Forest. The Tree Charter address different issues to the historic charter because society and priorities have changed so much. However, there has been no comparable statement of rights and responsibilities in the intervening 800 years. The Tree Charter aims to bring this discussion of the importance of woods and trees to people back to the forefront of public consciousness.

Aims 
The charter aims to join the dots between all the different areas of society in which trees give benefits so that it can recognize and protect the true value of trees to society. Organizations involved are from a variety of industries. This includes commercial forestry, health, wildlife conservation and many more.

To create this Tree Charter, thousands of tree ‘stories’ were collected from people across the UK about what trees and woods mean to them. A tree story is any expression of what trees and woods mean to people. They can be a sentence or longer phrase, a photo, audio clip or video. The tree stories were collected until the end of February 2017.

These tree stories collected from the UK public, along with specific consultations with forestry and sector professionals, will form the basis for the partner organizations to write the content of the final Tree Charter. The new Tree Charter document will not be legally binding, but more a set of guiding principles, to which politicians, organizations, community groups and individuals can be held to account.

The 10 Tree Charter Principles were announced on 27 March 2017. From this moment onwards, the public is being asked to sign to show support for the Tree Charter.

Purpose 
The Tree Charter will be a document which can be used to hold politicians, community groups and organizations to account, backed up by the body of evidence of over 60,000 public stories. It will be the basis each year of a joint statement from the partner organizations, which will demonstrate whether or not the aims of the Charter have been achieved.

Organizations involved 
Partner organizations involved in creating the Tree Charter:

 Action for Conservation
 Ahmadiyya Muslim Youth Association UK
 Ancient Tree Forum
 Arboricultural Association
 Bat Conservation Trust
 Black Environment Network
 Borders Forest Trust
 British Association for Shooting and Conservation
 Butterfly Conservation
 Campaign for National Parks (CNP)
 Campaign to Protect Rural England (CPRE)
 Caring For God's Acre
 Centre for Sustainable Healthcare
 Church of England
 CIEEM (Chartered Institute of Ecology and Environmental Management)
 City of Trees
 Climate Coalition
 Coigach Assynt Trust
 Common Ground
 Confor
 Confederation of Timber Industries (CTI)
 Continuous Cover Forestry Group
 Country Land and Business Association (CLA)
 Forest School Association (FSA)
 Froglife
 FSC-UK (Forest Stewardship Council)
 Game and Wildlife Conservation Trust
 Going Wild
 GreenBlue Urban
 GroundWork Gallery
 Grown in Britain
 Institute of Chartered Foresters (ICF)
 John Muir Trust
 Legal Sustainability Alliance (LSA)
 Llais y Goedwig
 MADE (Muslim Action for Development and Environment)
 Mersey Forest
 National Association of Local Councils
 National Forest
 National Trust
 National Union of Students (NUS)
 New Forest National Park Authority
 National Farmers' Union (NFU)
 Northern Ireland Council for Voluntary Action
 Northern Ireland Environment Link
 Order of Bards, Ovates and Druids
 Plantlife
 Reforesting Scotland
 RFS (Royal Forestry Society)
 RHS (Royal Horticultural Society)
 Royal Botanic Garden Edinburgh
 RSPB (Royal Society for the Protection of Birds)
 RSPB Wales
 Small Woods Association
 Soil Association
 SWOG (Small Woodland Owners' Group)
 Sylva Foundation
 TDAG (Trees and Design Action Group)
 The British Beekeepers Association
 The British Druid Order
 The Conservation Foundation
 The Conservation Volunteers (TCV)
 The Consulting Arborist Society (CAS)
 The Land Trust
 The Landscape Institute
 The Orchard Project
 The Pagan Federation
 The Sherwood Forest Trust
 The Tree Council
 The Wildlife Trusts
 The Windsor Estate
 Timber Trade Federation (TTF)
 Tir Coed
 Trees for Cities
 Wild Network
 Wildlife & Countryside Link
 Woodland Heritage
 Woodland Trust
 Woodlands.co.uk
 WWF-UK

References

External links

Trees
Organizations established in 2016